École Française Internationale de Colombo (EFIC) is a French international school in Colombo, Sri Lanka. It opened in 1979.

It serves levels maternelle (preschool) through lycée (senior high school). It directly teaches preschool and elementary school students and uses the National Centre for Distance Education (CNED) distance education programme with other levels.

References

External links

  École Française Internationale de Colombo

Schools in Colombo
International schools in Sri Lanka
Colombo
1979 establishments in Sri Lanka
Educational institutions established in 1979